Erik Karlsen (born 26 July 1953) is a Norwegian footballer who played as a forward. He played in one match for the Norway national football team in 1977. He spent his club career with Lillestrøm and Vålerenga.

References

External links
 

1953 births
Living people
Norwegian footballers
Norway international footballers
Place of birth missing (living people)
Association football forwards
Lillestrøm SK players
Vålerenga Fotball players